Humphry Legge, 8th Earl of Dartmouth,  (14 March 1888 – 16 October 1962) was a British peer and police officer.

Legge was the youngest son of the William Legge, 6th Earl of Dartmouth. During the First World War, he served as a commander with the Royal Navy and was awarded the Distinguished Service Order in 1919 and mentioned in despatches. On 10 April 1923, he married Roma Ernestine Horlick, the eldest daughter of Sir Ernest Horlick, 2nd Baronet. Together they had two children, Gerald Legge, 9th Earl of Dartmouth (1924–1997), and Hon. Heather Margaret Mary (born 1925, married Rognvald Herschell, 3rd Baron Herschell).

In 1932, Legge was appointed chief constable of Berkshire Constabulary after having been assistant chief constable of Staffordshire Constabulary from 1928 to 1932. In the 1946 New Years Honours, Legge was awarded the King's Police and Fire Services Medal (KPFSM). In 1947, he was appointed a Commander of the Royal Victorian Order. He retired as Chief Constable in 1953. In 1958, he inherited his brother's titles and died four years later, being succeeded by his son Gerald.

References

External links

1888 births
1962 deaths
British Chief Constables
Commanders of the Royal Victorian Order
Companions of the Distinguished Service Order
8
Royal Navy officers
English recipients of the Queen's Police Medal
Royal Navy officers of World War I
Humphry
Younger sons of earls